The Davao City Expressway is an expressway currently under feasibility study. It was proposed by President Rodrigo Duterte to mitigate the congestion on the Pan-Philippine Highway in Davao City.

Project Description

The expressway will have an overall length of 23.3km, which is divided into three different phases. The Phase I, Phase II and Phase III of the expressway is connected in the Carlos P. Garcia National Highway; however, the Phase II will be much further north, which starts from the soon to exist Panacan Interchange.

The DavEx will start construction in 2022 and will be completed in 2026.

Phases of Development and Cost

Phase I  - ₱ 23.1B
Elevated/Viaduct and At River (8.45 km)
Carlos P. Garcia National Highway (CPGNH),
Ma-a, Talomo to Sta. Ana Port, Agdao
Phase II - ₱ 23.4B
Elevated/Viaduct (Panacan-Ulas) (8.35 km)
CPGNH, Ma-a, Talomo to Panacan Road, Panacan
Phase III - ₱ 23.2B
At-Grade 6.5 km
CPGNH, Ma-a, Talomo to Bangkal, Talomo

Project Impact and Objectives

To reduce the traffic decongestion in the vital parts of Davao City.
To improve the economic ability of the city, by making an expressway which will improve the travel time from the port to different parts of the city.
To increase the productivity of different business sectors in the city.

Project Status

Authority to Procure was approved on 20 January 2017.
Preparation of the Terms of Reference (TOR), Approved Budget for the Contract (ABC) and other bidding documents.

See also

North Luzon East Expressway
Expressways of the Philippines
Mindanao

References 

Proposed roads in the Philippines
Roads in Davao del Sur
Toll roads in the Philippines
Davao City